Folkard is a surname. Notable people with the surname include:

Bert Folkard (1878–1937), Australian cricketer
Charles Folkard (1878–1963), English illustrator
Julia Bracewell Folkard (1849–1933), British painter
Mark Folkard (born 1965), Australian politician
Naomi Folkard (born 1983), English archer